This Ending is a Swedish melodic death metal band formed in 1991.

History 
This Ending was formed in 1991 as A Canorous Quartet by Fredrik Andersson, Mårten Hansen and Linus Nirbrant. After some changes, the line-up was complete with the addition of Leo Pignon and Jesper Kramming. The band released an EP, As Tears, in 1994, and two full-length albums: Silence of the World Beyond in 1996 and The Only Pure Hate in 1998. They performed numerous shows with acts like At the Gates, Dissection, Hypocrisy and Edge of Sanity. In 1998, the members decided to separate. Hansen went on to join October Tide, while Nirbrant, Löfgren, and Andersson formed a group called Guidance of Sin; however, Andersson left in 1999 to join Amon Amarth.

In 2004, Andersson recorded a 5-song demo under the name Curriculum Mortis. That winter, the members played with the idea of regrouping for something new, and in early 2005, they decided it was time for a new era, officially creating This Ending. During the spring and summer 13 songs were created, three of which were chosen for the downloadable demo, Let the World Burn, recorded later the same year. The band landed a deal on Metal Blade Records, and recorded their first full-length album, Inside the Machine, in September 2006.

In January 2009, the band announced the completion their second studio album, Dead Harvest. The music video for the song "Parasite" was premiered on the band's Myspace on January 17. The album was released on January 30 in Germany, Austria, Switzerland and Italy, February 2 in the rest of Europe, and February 3 in North America.

This Ending left Metal Blade Records in January 2011 and are planning to re-record the material they did as A Canorous Quintet in order to celebrate the 20th anniversary of having started under that name.

Discography

As A Canorous Quintet 
As Tears (1995)
Silence of the World Beyond (1996)
The Only Pure Hate (1998)

As This Ending 
Inside the Machine (2006)
Dead Harvest (2009)
Systematic Worship EP (2012)
Garden Of Death (2016)
Needles of Rust (2021)

Band members 
Mårten Hansen - vocals
Peter Nagy - drums
Linus Nirbrant - guitar
Linkan Pettersson - bass

References

External links 
This Ending at Encyclopaedia Metallum
This Ending at Last.fm
This Ending at Metal Blade Records

Swedish death metal musical groups
Musical groups established in 2005